In mathematics, Bochner spaces are a generalization of the concept of  spaces to functions whose values lie in a Banach space which is not necessarily the space  or  of real or complex numbers.

The space  consists of (equivalence classes of) all Bochner measurable functions  with values in the Banach space  whose norm  lies in the standard  space. Thus, if  is the set of complex numbers, it is the standard Lebesgue  space.

Almost all standard results on  spaces do hold on Bochner spaces too; in particular, the Bochner spaces  are Banach spaces for 

Bochner spaces are named for the mathematician Salomon Bochner.

Definition 

Given a measure space  a Banach space  and  the Bochner space  is defined to be the Kolmogorov quotient (by equality almost everywhere) of the space of all Bochner measurable functions  such that the corresponding norm is finite:

In other words, as is usual in the study of  spaces,  is a space of equivalence classes of functions, where two functions are defined to be equivalent if they are equal everywhere except upon a -measure zero subset of  As is also usual in the study of such spaces, it is usual to abuse notation and speak of a "function" in  rather than an equivalence class (which would be more technically correct).

Applications 

Bochner spaces are often used in the functional analysis approach to the study of partial differential equations that depend on time, e.g. the heat equation: if the temperature  is a scalar function of time and space, one can write  to make  a family  (parametrized by time) of functions of space, possibly in some Bochner space.

Application to PDE theory 

Very often, the space  is an interval of time over which we wish to solve some partial differential equation, and  will be one-dimensional Lebesgue measure. The idea is to regard a function of time and space as a collection of functions of space, this collection being parametrized by time.

with time derivative

Here  denotes the Sobolev Hilbert space of once-weakly differentiable functions with first weak derivative in  that vanish at the boundary of Ω (in the sense of trace, or, equivalently, are limits of smooth functions with compact support in Ω);  denotes the dual space of 

See also

References

 

Functional analysis
Partial differential equations
Sobolev spaces
Lp spaces